1st Zirimzibash, Bashkortostan
 2nd Zirimzibash, Bashkortostan